Glandora diffusa, the purple gromwell, syn. Lithodora diffusa, Lithospermum diffusa, is a species of flowering plant in the family Boraginaceae. It is suitable for cultivation in a rock garden or alpine garden.

Although there is a variety with white flowers, G. diffusa var. alba, the blue-flowered varieties are most valued in gardens for the intense azure color of their abundant blooms.  A number of cultivars have been developed for garden use. 

It needs a well-drained acid or neutral soil, as it is susceptible to root rot. It requires vernalization to flower.

The ancient Greek term lithodora literally means "stone gift", referring to its preferred habitat. Diffusa means "spreading", and refers to the plant's growth habit.

References

Garden plants of Europe
Blue flowers